John Morrice Cairns James, Baron Saint Brides,  (30 April 1916 – 26 November 1989), normally known as Morrice James, was a senior British diplomat. He served as British High Commissioner to Pakistan, India and Australia, and was known as a specialist in the affairs of the Indian Subcontinent.

Early life and Second World War
James was born on 30 April 1916 and was educated at Bradfield College and Balliol College, Oxford. He joined the Dominions Office in London in 1939, and was Private Secretary to the Permanent Under-Secretary of State from April to August 1940. In August 1940 he joined the Royal Navy as an Ordinary Seaman, was commissioned in the Royal Marines in February of the following year, and ended the war as a lieutenant colonel.

Career
James returned to the Dominions Office (which merged with the India Office in 1947 to form the Commonwealth Relations Office) in 1945, and served in South Africa, London, and Pakistan, where he headed the Deputy High Commissions in both Lahore and Karachi during the 1950s. He then served as Deputy High Commissioner in New Delhi before returning to Pakistan as High Commissioner from 1962 to 1965. From 1968 to 1971 he served once more in New Delhi, as High Commissioner, and was appointed High Commissioner to Australia in 1971. He retired from the Diplomatic Service in 1976.

Honours
James was appointed a Member of the Order of the British Empire (MBE) in 1944, a Companion of the Order of St Michael and St George (CMG) in 1957, a Commander of the Royal Victorian Order (CVO) in 1961, he was promoted to Knight Commander of the Order of St Michael and St George (KCMG) in 1962, and to Knight Grand Cross (GCMG) in 1975. He was appointed King of Arms of the Order of St Michael and St George in 1975. He was appointed to the Privy Council in 1966, and was created a life peer as Baron Saint Brides, of Hasguard in the County of Dyfed on 8 February 1977.

Arms

References

|-

1916 births
1989 deaths
High Commissioners of the United Kingdom to India
High Commissioners of the United Kingdom to Australia
High Commissioners of the United Kingdom to Pakistan
Members of the Privy Council of the United Kingdom
Knights Grand Cross of the Order of St Michael and St George
Commanders of the Royal Victorian Order
Royal Marines officers
Royal Marines personnel of World War II
Members of the Order of the British Empire
Life peers
People educated at Bradfield College
Diplomatic peers
Royal Navy personnel of World War II
Royal Navy sailors
Life peers created by Elizabeth II
Civil servants in the Commonwealth Relations Office